Powerlink or Power Link may refer to:

 Ethernet Powerlink
 Great Belt Power Link
 Powerlink Queensland
 Sunrise Powerlink